Justin Morrison (born August 10, 1979, in Los Angeles, California, United States) is an American former professional ice hockey player who last played for Lukko of the SM-liiga.

Playing career
Justin Morrison starting playing hockey late in his childhood — around age 11 — after seeing the sport at a local rink. His talent was quickly recognized as he moved from local Los Angeles teams to playing for the Omaha Lancers in the United States Hockey League. Soon thereafter, he became a member of the USA U-17 team that participated in the World U-17 Hockey Challenge. Morrison has since played for the United States World Junior Team in the 1999 World Junior Ice Hockey Championships, and has been a recurring member of the USA Hockey Inline Team. As a teenager, Morrison appeared in the movie D2: The Mighty Ducks as a street hockey player.

Morrison's collegiate career consisted of four years at Colorado College playing in the WCHA. He is a current member of the university's Century Club, having tallied more than 100 collegiate points. Morrison was drafted by the Vancouver Canucks in the 1998 NHL Entry Draft in the 3rd round, as the 81st pick overall. At the time, he was the second-highest NHL draft pick in the school's illustrious hockey history. He was also the first African-American hockey player from Los Angeles to be drafted into the NHL.

As a professional, Morrison spent four seasons with the Vancouver Canucks of the NHL and their affiliate the Manitoba Moose of the AHL. Morrison also spent a season with Atlanta Thrashers, playing for the Chicago Wolves in the AHL.

Morrison's first season overseas was in the Swedish Elitserien playing for Modo Hockey. Morrison tallied 28 points in 34 games (18 goals, 10 assists) and helped lead his team to an SEL Championship. Morrison has also played for Frölunda HC in Elitserien, for the Hamburg Freezers in the DEL, and for a short time with both the HC Dinamo Minsk in the KHL and Switzerland's HC Davos.

For the 2009–10 season Morrison returned the Finnish SM-liiga, where he was the top scorer for Lukko and among the top scorers in the league, having tallied 51 points in 50 games during the regular season, and was nominated as league MVP.

In 2009, while playing for Lukko, Morrison again joined USA Hockey, this time for the Deutschland Cup, hosted by the city of Munich. Morrison took home Player of the Game honors against Germany for his 2-goal effort, and was the USA's top scorer for the tournament. Team USA took home 2nd place to Germany after losing in a shoot-out to the Czech Republic.

For the 2010-11 season, Morrison returned to Lukko where he had another productive season, positioning himself as one of the league's most exciting players and prolific scorers.

Privates 
Justin Morrison lives in Portland, Oregon with his two sons.

Career statistics

Awards and honors

References

External links

1979 births
Living people
African-American ice hockey players
American men's ice hockey right wingers
Chicago Wolves players
Colorado College Tigers men's ice hockey players
Columbia Inferno players
Frölunda HC players
Ice hockey people from Los Angeles
Lukko players
Manitoba Moose players
Modo Hockey players
Omaha Lancers players
SC Rapperswil-Jona Lakers players
Vancouver Canucks draft picks
21st-century African-American sportspeople
20th-century African-American sportspeople